Chino Sing (born Ariel Sing Gómez; March 19, 1985) is a Dominican musician. Best known as the lead vocalist and contributing songwriter of extinct Dominican rock act TKR. He has also participated in side-projects like El Pueblo and others.

Chino is well known for his soothing jazzy vocals, rich poetry and reggae/caribbean rhythm fusion. He is considered one of the most important and influencing young artists in the Dominican scene. He was nominated at a very early age to the maximum arts Award of Dominican Republic, the Cassandra Awards for arts and music in 2007. He is also a well respected politics/activism figure amongst the youth, working with different environmental and humanitarian causes, using his music to spread the positive messages and protest.

His works include several album releases, international presentations and collaborations with respected artists of Latin music.
Currently works in his new album as a solo artist, along with other projects to be launched in 2014.

Album Releases
TKR 2002 - The Kidnapped Rodents
TKR 2005 - Inertia (Nominated to the Cassandra Awards, #1 singles on local/Latin charts)
TKR 2007 - Lienzo (#1 singles on local/Latin charts)
El Pueblo 2009 - The NY Sessions EP
El Pueblo 2010 - ISLA 
MIXTAPE 2010 - Various single Releases
Chino Sing 2013 - Me Voy
 Homenaje al Terror Luis Dias 2014 ft. Hugo Molina

Projects
TKR 2002-2007
El Pueblo 2008-2010
Chino Sing 2013

Collaborations
Mr. Clicka ft. Chino Sing - De eso se trata el show (2008)
El Pueblo ft. Chino Sing - Miel de abeja (2009)
El Pueblo ft. Chino Sing - The NY Sessions EP (2009) EP Album
Gnómico ft. Chino Sing - Flores Azules (2010)
Gnómico ft. Chino Sing - 4% (2011)
Lugo Santiago ft. Chino Sing - Ta' de To' (2012)
Lo Correcto ft. Chino Sing - Tienes lo que quiero (2013)
Acentoh ft. Chino Sing - Coro Chillin' (2013)

Activism
Sing is known for assuming positions on environmental and conservation issues as well as humanitarian causes.
He has used music and art to influence the youths into taking action for the benefit of poor communities, true reality of third world countries.
Has served as a voluntary for humanitarian aid in Haiti and Dominican Republic, engaging his fans into joining forces and working in these important matters.

References

 Dominican Rock, Wikipedia
 uepa.com
 anivelde.com
 lacasetera.com

Dominican rock

1985 births
21st-century Dominican Republic male singers
Dominican Republic songwriters
Living people